Elisa Kreisinger (born 1986), known as Pop Culture Pirate, is a Brooklyn-based video artist and educator.

Early life 
Kreisinger was born in New Jersey. In 2008, she received a B.A. in Communications & Women's Studies from Simmons College in Boston.

Career

New media art 
Kreisinger started to explore the idea of feminist remix of media as an undergraduate at Simmons College, with a focus on remixing the feminist narrative as it relates to identity. She interned at Cambridge Community TV, where she had access to equipment and video training.

Kreisinger's videos remix Mad Men into feminists and The Real Housewives into lesbians. Her Mad Men trailers on Vimeo have had more viewership than the original series' YouTube trailers.

Kreisinger's work explores feminist and queer-friendly perspectives through remix and mashup of mainstream media texts. The Queer Carrie Project recuts entire seasons of Sex and the City into short, 1-3 minute webisodes that portray its characters as lesbians. Most of Kreisinger's work uses the language and style of existing TV shows or Hollywood editing as a way to, as she describes it, "talk back" to pop culture.

Kreisinger's work has been featured in online publications such as Salon and California Western School of Law's New Media Rights.

Digital 
From 2012 to 2014, Kreisinger worked at Eileen Fisher in Communications. From December 2014 to July 2015, Kreisinger was Creative Director at Upworthy.

Since July 2015, Kreisinger is an Executive Producer at Refinery29.

She is a former moderator at Political Remix.

Copyright and fair use 
Kreisinger's work engages with concepts of copyright laws and fair use. Despite operating on legal terms of fair use for parodic, educational and transformative purposes, Kreisinger's work is often erroneously flagged for copyright violation on video sharing sites such as YouTube.

Kreisinger is a vocal advocate for fair use, digital literacy and critical uses of pop culture and gender representation within mainstream media. She has presented at industry and academic conferences such as Open Video Conference, Mobility Shifts Conference, among others.

In 2012, Kreisinger testified at the US Copyright Office, which helped to win crucial exemptions to the Digital Millennium Copyright Act.

There was a US Copyright Office White paper that focused on appropriation art online as a result of the exhibit, Fair Use(r).

Exhibitions
Solo exhibitions
 2014: FRAMED! The Attack on Fair Use and Digital Artists on the Internet, Kianga Ellis Projects
Group exhibitions
 2012: South by Southwest (Austin)
 2014: Fair Use(r), Eyebeam (New York)
 2014: Fair Use(r), Kianga Ellis Projects (New York)
 2014: Fowler Project Space
 Museum of Film and Television Berlin  (Berlin)
 MIP Cube (France)

Honors 
 2013: Eyebeam, Project Resident
 2013: NYU School of Engineering, Women in Technology Fellow

Works and publications 
Works
 2009: QueerCarrie: Season 1 – footage: Sex and the City
 2009: QueerCarrie: Season 2 – footage: Sex and the City
 2010: QueerCarrie: Seasons 3-6 – footage: Sex and the City
 2011: Adrienne Maloof, Peacemaker/ Feminist: Real Housewives of Beverly Hills – footage: Real Housewives of Beverly Hills
 2012: Mad Men: Set Me Free – footage: Mad Men, audio: The Supremes, "You Keep Me Hangin' On"
 2012: QueerMen: Don Loves Roger – footage: Mad Men
 2013: Picasso Baby I'm Feeling 22 – footage: Jay Z, "Picasso Baby" video, audio: Taylor Swift, "22"
Publications

References

Further reading

External links 
 
 
 Pop Culture Pirate on Vimeo
 Elisa Kreisinger on YouTube
 Strong Opinions, Loosely Held podcast at Refinery29

1986 births
Living people
Artists from New York (state)
American women artists
Feminist artists
21st-century American women
Primetime Emmy Award winners